The 2007 Governor General's Awards for Literary Merit: Finalists in 14 categories (70 books) were announced October 16, winners announced November 27, and awards presented  December 13. The prize for writers and illustrators was $25,000 and "a specially crafted copy of the winning book". 

The $25,000 cash prize had been "increased from $15,000 in celebration of the Canada Council's 50th anniversary". The publishers of winning books continued to receive $3000, the creators of losing finalists $1000.

English

French

References

Governor General's Awards
Governor General's Awards
Governor General's Awards